Exhibition of Leningrad artists of 1970 dedicated to the 25th anniversary of victory over Nazi Germany was opened in Exhibition Halls of the Leningrad Union of Soviet Artists and become one of the notable art exhibitions of 1970 in the USSR.

History and organization 
For the organization and preparation of the exhibition, an exhibition committee was formed, consisting of authoritative art experts. An exhibition catalog was published. At the whole exhibition, over 220 artists of Leningrad  attended.

Contributing artists 
In the largest Department of Painting were exhibited art works of 81 authors. There were Vladimir Andreev, Sergei Babkov, Nikolai Baskakov, Yuri Belov, Dmitry Belyaev, Alexander Blinkov, Veniamin Borisov, Dmitry Buchkin, Rostislav Vovkushevsky, Nikolai Galakhov, Evgeny Galunov, Vasily Golubev, Alexander Gulayev, Nina Ivanova, Mikhail Kozell, Elena Kostenko, Anna Kostina, Yaroslav Krestovsky, Boris Lavrenko, Ivan Lavsky, Efim Latsky, Vladimir Malagis, Mikhail Natarevich, Yuri Neprintsev, Dmitry Oboznenko, Ivan Savenko, Vladimir Seleznev, Alexander Semionov, Arseny Semionov, Joseph Serebriany, Nikolai Timkov, Yuri Tulin, and others painters of the Leningrad School.

In the Department of Sculptures were exhibited art works of 23 sculptors. Department of graphics presented a creation of 83 artists.

Contributed artworks 
For exposure have been selected works of painting, sculpture and graphics, applied art created by artists from Leningrad during the Great Patriotic War and the siege of Leningrad, as well as during the postwar decades.
Some of them were subsequently found in the collections of Soviet Art museums, as well as domestic and foreign galleries and collectors.

Acknowledgment 
Exhibition of Leningrad artists of 1970 was widely covered in press and in literature on Soviet fine art.

See also 
 Fine Art of Leningrad
 Leningrad School of Painting
 1970 in fine arts of the Soviet Union
 Saint Petersburg Union of Artists
 Socialist realism

References

Sources 

 Выставка произведений ленинградских художников, посвященная 25-летию Победы над фашистской Германией. Каталог. Л., Художник РСФСР, 1972.
 Справочник членов Ленинградской организации Союза художников РСФСР. Л., Художник РСФСР, 1980.
 Художники народов СССР. Биобиблиографический словарь. Т.1-4. М., Искусство, 1970–1995.
 Справочник членов Союза художников СССР. Т.1-2. М., Советский художник, 1979.
 Хроника узловых событий художественной жизни России 1960-1980-х годов // Time for Change. The Art of 1960–1985 in the Soviet Union. Saint Petersburg, State Russian Museum, 2006. 
 Sergei V. Ivanov. Unknown Socialist Realism. The Leningrad School. Saint Petersburg, NP-Print Edition, 2007. P.395, 417, 442. , 
 Юбилейный Справочник выпускников Санкт-Петербургского академического института живописи, скульптуры и архитектуры имени И. Е. Репина Российской Академии художеств. 1915—2005. Санкт Петербург, «Первоцвет», 2007.

Art exhibitions in Russia
1970 works
1970 in the Soviet Union
Socialist realism